The 1944 Philadelphia Athletics season involved the A's finishing fifth in the American League with a record of 72 wins and 82 losses.

Offseason

Spring training 
The Athletics considered using the Bader Field ballpark in Atlantic City for their 1944 spring training site. On November 17, 1943, Connie Mack examined Bader Field and the National Guard Armory as one possibility. But he knew the New York Yankees were already considering it. The A's went to McCurdy Field in Frederick, Maryland when the Yankees chose Atlantic City.

Notable transactions 
 October 11, 1943: Don Heffner and Bob Swift were traded by the Athletics to the Detroit Tigers for Rip Radcliff.
 February 17, 1944: Sam Zoldak and Barney Lutz (minors) were traded by the Athletics to the St. Louis Browns for Frankie Hayes.

Regular season

Season standings

Record vs. opponents

Notable transactions 
 April 15, 1944: Al Simmons was signed as a free agent by the Athletics.

Roster

Player stats

Batting

Starters by position 
Note: Pos = Position; G = Games played; AB = At bats; H = Hits; Avg. = Batting average; HR = Home runs; RBI = Runs batted in

Other batters 
Note: G = Games played; AB = At bats; H = Hits; Avg. = Batting average; HR = Home runs; RBI = Runs batted in

Pitching

Starting pitchers 
Note: G = Games pitched; IP = Innings pitched; W = Wins; L = Losses; ERA = Earned run average; SO = Strikeouts

Relief pitchers 
Note: G = Games pitched; W = Wins; L = Losses; SV = Saves; ERA = Earned run average; SO = Strikeouts

Farm system 

LEAGUE CHAMPIONS: Lancaster

References

External links
1944 Philadelphia Athletics team page at Baseball Reference
1944 Philadelphia Athletics team page at www.baseball-almanac.com

Oakland Athletics seasons
Philadelphia Athletics season
Oak